John Malcolm Couchman (Born 30 May 1913 Salisbury, Wiltshire, Great Britain - Died 17 November 2004 aged 91) was a British rower who competed at the 1936 Summer Olympics.

Couchman was educated at Christ Church, Oxford. In 1933, 1934 and 1935  he was a member of the losing Oxford boat in the Boat Races.  In 1936 he was a member of the crew of the eight which came fourth representing  Great Britain at the 1936 Summer Olympics in Berlin in the Men’s Coxed Eights.

See also
List of Oxford University Boat Race crews

References

1913 births
2004 deaths
Alumni of Christ Church, Oxford
British male rowers
Olympic rowers of Great Britain
Rowers at the 1936 Summer Olympics
Oxford University Boat Club rowers